"All the Presidents' Heads" is the twenty-third episode of the sixth season of the animated sitcom Futurama, and originally aired July 28, 2011 on Comedy Central.

Plot
Fry goes to his night job at the Head Museum where he feeds the preserved heads of the presidents of the United States. He invites the Planet Express crew to the museum for a party, where they become drunk and begin ingesting the preservative fluid inside the jars. Doing so causes them and everyone standing nearby to temporarily travel back in time to the eras each head originally came from. Professor Farnsworth reasons that this time travel effect is caused by the rare powdered crystalline opal used to make the fluid, which keeps the heads alive in a temporal bubble. After learning from George Washington's head that one of his own ancestors, David Farnsworth, was one of American history's most nefarious traitors during the American Revolutionary War, Professor Farnsworth becomes determined to salvage his family's reputation. He dumps a vial containing the world's entire powdered opal supply into Washington's jar and licks his head, transporting himself, Fry, Leela, and Bender back to colonial-era New York in 1775.
The four learn from the Continental Congress that David Farnsworth works at Benjamin Franklin's print shop in Philadelphia, where David would forge counterfeit money that would threaten to destroy the country's economy should it enter circulation. Though they do not find David at the shop, they discover a fake Massachusetts halfpenny made of worthless tin and determine he has gone to Paul Revere's silver shop in Boston. They capture David just as Revere begins his ride to alert Lexington of the imminent British attack that would start the American Revolution. However, Fry unwittingly takes one of the two lanterns hanging at the Old North Church to burn the forged money, causing Revere to wrongly warn of the British attack "by land" rather than "by sea".
The four are suddenly sent back to 3011 and find that history has been altered: Great Britain has won the Revolutionary War and taken over all of North America, turning it into "West Britannia". In this alternate timeline, David Farnsworth killed George Washington by smothering him with his wig and was rewarded with a dukedom, making Professor Farnsworth a noble landowner and consort of the Queen of England. Having depleted the world's crystalline opal supply, Farnsworth despairs that there is no way to travel to the past to fix their mistake until he notices the Andamooka Opal on the queen's crown. After stealing and crushing it, the four are able to use the preserved head of David Farnsworth to return to colonial times and restore the timeline. Once they return to 3011, everything is restored as it was before history was first altered, with one change: in place of the Gadsden flag hanging in the Head Museum is a similarly designed flag displaying Bender and a colonial spelling of his catchphrase, "Bite my shiny metal ass".

Cultural references
 The opening sequence features Zoich, a proposed Russian XXII Winter Olympics mascot, which itself was inspired by Futurama'''s Hypnotoad.
 Among the U.S. presidents who are depicted in this episode are John Adams, Chester A. Arthur, George H. W. Bush, George W. Bush, Jimmy Carter, Grover Cleveland, Bill Clinton, Calvin Coolidge, Dwight D. Eisenhower, Millard Fillmore, Gerald Ford, Warren G. Harding, Rutherford B. Hayes, Herbert Hoover, Andrew Jackson, Thomas Jefferson, Lyndon B. Johnson, Abraham Lincoln, James Madison, Franklin Pierce, James K. Polk, Ronald Reagan, Franklin D. Roosevelt, Theodore Roosevelt, William Howard Taft, Martin Van Buren, John Tyler and George Washington.
Benjamin Franklin,  Alexander Hamilton, Walter Mondale, Paul Revere and Henry Kissinger are also depicted.

 Reception 
Zack Handlen of The A.V. Club'' gave the episode a B−.

References

External links
 
 

Futurama (season 6) episodes
2011 American television episodes
Television episodes about the American Revolution
Alternate history television episodes
Television episodes about time travel
Fiction set in 1775
Fiction set in 1776
Cultural depictions of presidents of the United States
Cultural depictions of George Washington
Cultural depictions of Abraham Lincoln
Cultural depictions of Benjamin Franklin
Cultural depictions of Andrew Jackson
Cultural depictions of Warren G. Harding
Cultural depictions of Theodore Roosevelt
Cultural depictions of Franklin D. Roosevelt
Cultural depictions of Dwight D. Eisenhower
Cultural depictions of Lyndon B. Johnson
Cultural depictions of Henry Kissinger
Cultural depictions of Gerald Ford
Cultural depictions of Ronald Reagan
Cultural depictions of George H. W. Bush
Cultural depictions of George W. Bush
Cultural depictions of Bill Clinton
Cultural depictions of Paul Revere
Cultural depictions of Andy Warhol
Cultural depictions of Alexander Hamilton
Television episodes set in the 1770s